Novoilyinsk is a rural locality (a selo) in Zaigrayevsky District, Republic of Buryatia, Russia. The population was 4,700 as of 2010. There are 36 streets.

Geography 
Novoilyinsk is located 40 km southeast of Zaigrayevo (the district's administrative centre) by road. Tashelan is the nearest rural locality.

References 

Rural localities in Zaigrayevsky District